You Could Be Born Again is the second album by The Free Design; it was released in 1968. It is the band's first album as a quartet, with the members' sister Ellen Dedrick added to the lineup.

Track listing
"You Could Be Born Again"
"A Leaf Has Veins"
"California Dreamin'"
"The Windows of the World"
"Eleanor Rigby"
"Quartet No. 6 in D Minor"
"I Like the Sunrise"
"I Found Love"
"Daniel Dolphin"
"Happy Together"
"Ivy on a Windy Day"
"An Elegy"

Personnel
 Bruce Dedrick - vocals, guitar
 Chris Dedrick - vocals, guitar
 Ellen Dedrick - vocals
 Sandra Dedrick - vocals, keyboards
 Stefanie Dedrick – vocals
 Jay Berliner - Guitar
 Ralph Casale - Guitar
 Al Casamenti - Guitar
 Tony Mottola - Guitar
 Bucky Pizzarelli - Guitar
 Russ Savakus - Bass
 Paul Griffin - Keyboards
 Dick Hyman - Keyboards
 George Devens - Percussion
 Phil Kraus - Percussion
 Bill LaVorgna - Percussion
 Bob Papaleoni - Percussion
 Joe Venuto - Percussion
 Earl Chopin - French Horn
 Ray Alonge - French Horn
 Tony Miranda - French Horn
 Rusty Dedrick - Trumpet
 John Frosk - Trumpet
 Harold Lieberman - Trumpet
 Paul Faulise - Trombone
 Urbie Green - Trombone
 Buddy Morrow - Trombone
 Harvey E. Phillips - Tuba
 Joe Palmer - Woodwind
 Romeo Penque - Woodwind
 Joe Soldo - Woodwind
 Stan Webb - Woodwind
 Julius Schacter - Violin
 George Ricci - Cello
 Harvey Shapiro - Cello

References 

The Free Design albums
1968 albums